This is an incomplete list of solar eclipses visible from the United States between 1001 and 3000. All eclipses whose path of totality or annularity passes through the land territory of the current fifty U.S. states are included. For lists of eclipses worldwide, see the list of 20th-century solar eclipses and 21st-century solar eclipses.

Eclipses between 1001 and 3000

Atlanta 
 1205 Sep 14 (Total)
 1259 Oct 17 (Total)
 1301 Feb 09 (Annular)
 1394 Jul 28 (Annular)
 1491 May 08 (Annular)
 1536 Jun 18 (Annular)
 1608 Aug 10 (Annular)
 1623 Oct 23 (Total)
 1628 Dec 25 (Annular)
 1673 Feb 16 (Annular)
 1778 Jun 24 (Total)
 1831 Feb 12 (Annular)
 1865 Oct 19 (Annular)
 1984 May 30 (Annular)
 2078 May 11 (Total)
 2165 Sep 05 (Annular)

Boston 
 1008 Oct 30 (Annular)
 1234 Mar 01 (Annular)
 1281 Aug 15 (Annular)
 1536 Jun 18 (Annular)
 1791 Apr 03 (Annular)
 1806 Jun 16 (Total)
 1854 May 26 (Annular)
 1875 Sep 29 (Annular)
 2200 Apr 14  (Total)
 2247 Sep 29 (Annular)

Charlotte 
 1257 Jun 13 (Total)
 1301 Feb 09 (Annular)
 1394 Jul 28 (Annular)
 1442 Jul 07 (Total)
 1491 May 08 (Annular)
 1536 Jun 18 (Annular)
 1623 Oct 23 (Total)
 1673 Feb 16 (Annular)
 1778 Jun 24 (Total)
 1831 Feb 12 (Annular)
 1869 Aug 07 (Total)
 2017 Aug 21 (Total)
 2078 May 11 (Total)
 2153 Oct 17 (Total)

Chicago 
 1008 Oct 30 (Annular)
 1194 Apr 22 (Total)
 1379 May 16 (Total)
 1558 Apr 18 (Total)
 1806 Jun 16 (Total)
 1811 Sep 17 (Annular)
 1994 May 10 (Annular)
 2099 Sep 14 (Total)
 2205 Jan 21 (Total)

Cincinnati 
 1395 Jan 21 (Total)
 1791 Apr 03 (Annular)
 2154 Apr 12 (Annular)

Cleveland 
 1451 Jun 28 (Total)
 1791 Apr 03 (Annular)
 1806 Jun 16 (Total)
 1811 Sep 17 (Annular)
 1838 Sep 18 (Annular)
 1994 May 10 (Annular)
 2024 Apr 08 (Total)
 2111 Aug 04 (Annular)

Columbus 
 1395 Jan 21 (Total)
 1791 Apr 03 (Annular)
 1811 Sep 17 (Annular)
 1838 Sep 18 (Annular)
 2099 Sep 14 (Total)
 2154 Apr 12 (Annular)
 2251 Jul 19 (Annular)

Denver 
 1618 Jul 21 (Total)
 1878 Jul 29 (Total)
 1918 Jun 08 (Total)
 2193 Aug 26 (Annular)

Detroit 
 1008 Oct 30 (Annular)
 1048 Sep 10 (Annular)
 1062 Dec 03 (Annular)
 1451 Jun 28 (Total)
 1806 Jun 16 (Total)
 1811 Sep 17 (Annular)
 1838 Sep 18 (Annular)
 1994 May 10 (Annular)
 2099 Sep 14 (Total)
 2111 Aug 04 (Annular)

El Paso 
 1062 Dec 03 (Annular)
 1318 Aug 26 (Hybrid)
 1623 Oct 23 (Total)
 1694 Jun 22 (Annular)
 1821 Aug 27 (Annular)
 1994 May 10 (Annular)
 2165 Sep 05 (Annular)
 2251 Jul 19 (Annular)

Indianapolis 
 1008 Oct 30 (Annular)
 1062 Dec 03 (Annular)
 1205 Sep 14 (Total)
 1791 Apr 03 (Annular)
 2024 Apr 08 (Total)
 2153 Oct 17 (Total)
 2154 Apr 12 (Annular)
 2251 Jul 19 (Annular)

Kansas City 

 2017 Aug 21 (Total)
 2156 Apr 12 (Annular)

Las Vegas 
 1062 Dec 03 (Annular)
 1117 Jan 04 (Annular)
 1234 Mar 01  (Annular)
 1257 Jun 13 (Total)
 1318 Aug 26 (Hybrid)
 1679 Apr 10 (Total)
 1724 May 22 (Total)
 1782 Apr 12 (Annular)
 2207 Nov 20 (Total)

Los Angeles 
 1062 Dec 03 (Annular)
 1117 Jan 04 (Annular)
 1196 Sep 13 (Total)
 1225 Mar 10 (Annular)
 1557 Apr 28 (Total)
 1623 Oct 23 (Total)
 1647 Jan 05 (Annular)
 1679 Apr 10 (Total)
 1724 May 22 (Total)
 1782 Apr 12 (Annular)
 1992 Jan 04 (Annular)
 2121 Jul 14 (Annular)
 2131 Dec 19 (Annular)

Louisville 
 1395 Jan 21 (Total)
 1531 Mar 18 (Hybrid)
 1694 Jun 22 (Annular)
 1791 Apr 03 (Annular)
 1869 Aug 07 (Total)
 2121 Jul 14 (Annular)
 2153 Oct 17 (Total)
 2154 Apr 12 (Annular)
 2251 Jul 19 (Annular)

Miami 
 1077 Feb 25 (Total)
 1130 Apr 09 (Total)
 1383 Mar 04 (Annular)
 1481 May 28 (Annular)
 1619 Jan 15 (Annular)
 1737 Mar 01 (Annular)
 1752 May 13 (Total)
 1777 Jan 09 (Annular)
 2045 Aug 12 (Total)
 2197 Jun 15 (Annular)
 2240 Feb 23 (Annular)

Milwaukee 
 1811 Sep 17 (Annular)
 1838 Sep 18 (Annular)
 2048 Jun 11 (Annular)
 2099 Sep 14 (Total)
 2111 Aug 04 (Annular)
 2205 Jan 21 (Total)
 2213 Feb 21 (Annular)

Minneapolis 
 1205 Sep 14 (Total)
 1285 Jun 04 (Hybrid)
 1503 Mar 27 (Total)
 1954 Jun 30 (Total)
 2099 Sep 14 (Total)
 2106 May 03 (Total)
 2111 Aug 04 (Annular)
 2213 Feb 21 (Annular)

Nashville 

 1062 Dec 03 (Annular)
 1151 Aug 13 (Total)
 1205 Sep 14 (Total)
 1234 Mar 01 (Annular)
 1257 Jun 13 (Total)
 1279 Apr 12 (Annular)
 1442 Jul 07 (Total)
 1478 Jul 29 (Total)
 1628 Dec 25 (Annular)
 1865 Oct 19 (Annular)
 2017 Aug 21 (Total)

New Orleans 
 1180 Jan 28 (Annular)
 1259 Oct 17 (Total)
 1491 May 08 (Annular)
 1618 Jul 21 (Total)
 1651 Apr 19 (Annular)
 1727 Mar 22 (Annular)
 1777 Jan 09 (Annular)
 1778 Jun 24 (Total)
 1900 May 28 (Total)
 1984 May 30 (Annular)
 2078 May 11 (Total)
 2238 Oct 08 (Annular)

New York 
 1008 Oct 30 (Annular)
 1079 Jul 01 (Total)
 1142 Aug 22 (Total)
 1234 Mar 01 (Annular)
 1349 Dec 10 (Total)
 1357 Jul 17 (Annular)
 1478 Jul 29 (Total)
 1520 Oct 11 (Annular)
 1536 Jun 18 (Annular)
 1574 Nov 13 (Annular)
 1791 Apr 03 (Annular)
 1838 Sep 18 (Annular)
 1925 Jan 25 (Total)
 2079 May 01 (Total)
 2144 Oct 26 (Total)
 2200 Apr 14 (Total)

Oklahoma City 
 1531 Mar 18 (Hybrid)
 1618 Jul 21 (Total)
 1918 June 08 (Total)
 2045 Aug 12 (Total)
 2251 Jul 19 (Annular)

Orlando 
 1050 Jan 25 (Total)
 1064 Apr 19 (Annular)
 1180 Jan 28 (Annular)
 1181 Jul 13 (Annular)
 1259 Oct 17 (Total)
 1325 Apr 13 (Total)
 1355 Mar 14 (Annular)
 1557 Apr 28 (Total)
 1600 Jul 10 (Total)
 1625 Mar 08 (Total)
 1737 Mar 01 (Annular)
 1908 Jun 28 (Annular)
 1918 Jun 08 (Total)
 2045 Aug 12 (Total)

Philadelphia 
 1008 Oct 30 (Annular)
 1079 Jul 01 (Total)
 1142 Aug 22 (Total)
 1234 Mar 01 (Annular)
 1478 Jul 29 (Total)
 1536 Jun 18 (Annular)
 1574 Nov 13 (Annular)
 1684 Jul 12 (Hybrid)
 1694 Jun 22 (Annular)
 1791 Apr 03 (Annular)
 1811 Sep 17 (Annular)
 1838 Sep 18 (Annular)
 2144 Oct 26 (Total)
 2154 Apr 12 (Annular)
 2200 Apr 14  (Total)

Pittsburgh 
 1395 Jan 21 (Total)
 1451 Jun 28 (Total)
 1791 Apr 03 (Annular)
 1811 Sep 17 (Annular)
 1838 Sep 18 (Annular)
 2111 Aug 04 (Annular)
 2251 Jul 19 (Annular)

Portland 
 1455 Apr 16 (Annular)
 1527 May 30 (Annular)
 1603 May 11 (Annular)
 1618 Jul 21 (Total)
 1865 Oct 19 (Annular)
 1979 Feb 26 (Total)
 2077 Nov 15 (Annular)
 2084 Jul 03 (Annular)
 2169 Jun 25 (Total)

San Diego 
 1062 Dec 03 (Annular)
 1117 Jan 04 (Annular)
 1156 Nov 14 (Annular)
 1196 Sep 13 (Total)
 1496 Aug 08 (Total)
 1782 Apr 12 (Annular)
 1923 Sep 10 (Total)
 1992 Jan 04 (Annular)
 2131 Dec 19 (Annular)
 2154 Apr 12 (Annular)

San Francisco 
 1051 Jul 10 (Annular)
 1062 Dec 3 (Annular)
 1424 Jun 26 (Total)

San Jose 
 1062 Dec 03 (Annular)
 1313 Nov 18 (Total)

Seattle 
 1527 May 30 (Annular)
 1565 Nov 22 (Annular)
 1860 Jul 18 (Total)
 1865 Oct 19 (Annular)
 2084 Jul 03 (Annular)
 2169 Jun 25 (Total)

St. Louis 
 1442 Jul 07 (Total)
 1628 Dec 25 (Annular)
 1791 Apr 03 (Annular)
 1865 Oct 19 (Annular)
 1869 Aug 07 (Total)
 1994 May 10 (Annular)
 2017 Aug 21 (Total)
 2024 Apr 8 (Total)
 2154 Apr 12 (Annular)

Tampa 
 1050 Jan 25 (Total)
 1064 Apr 19 (Annular)
 1180 Jan 28 (Annular)
 1181 Jul 13 (Annular)
 1325 Apr 13 (Total)
 1355 Mar 14 (Annular)
 1600 Jul 10 (Total)
 1625 Mar 08 (Total)
 1737 Mar 01 (Annular)
 1908 Jun 28 (Annular)
 2045 Aug 12 (Total)

Washington DC 
 1008 Oct 30 (Annular)
 1079 Jul 01 (Total)
 1234 Mar 01 (Annular)
 1451 Jun 28 (Total)
 1478 Jul 29 (Total)
 1536 Jun 18 (Annular)
 1694 Jun 22 (Annular)
 1791 Apr 03 (Annular)
 1811 Sep 17 (Annular)
 1838 Sep 18 (Annular)
 2111 Aug 04 (Annular)
 2154 Apr 12 (Annular)

Salem 
 1097 Jul 11 (Total)
 1427 Apr 26 (Annular)
 1455 Apr 16 (Annular)
 1503 Mar 27 (Total)
 1742 Jun 03 (Total)
 2017 Aug 21 (Total)
 2077 Nov 15 (Annular)
 2084 Jul 03 (Annular)

Charleston 
 1219 Dec 08 (Annular)
 1437 Apr 05 (Annular)
 1442 Jul 07 (Total)
 1491 May 08 (Annular)
 1628 Dec 25 (Annular)
 1834 Nov 30 (Total)
 1865 Oct 19 (Annular)
 1970 Mar 07 (Total)
 2017 Aug 21 (Total)
 2052 Mar 30 (Total)
 2153 Oct 17 (Total)
 2165 Sep 05 (Annular)

Dallas 
 1057 Sep 01 (Annular)
 1062 Dec 03 (Annular)
 1394 Jul 28 (Annular)
 1557 Apr 28 (Total)
 1623 Oct 23 (Total)
 1777 Jan 09 (Annular)
 1821 Aug 27 (Annular)
 1878 Jul 29 (Total)
 2024 Apr 08 (Total)
 2165 Sep 05 (Annular)
 2238 Oct 08 (Annular)

Fort Worth 
 1057 Sep 01 (Annular)
 1062 Dec 03 (Annular)
 1394 Jul 28 (Annular)
 1557 Apr 28 (Total)
 1623 Oct 23 (Total)
 1777 Jan 09 (Annular)
 1821 Aug 27 (Annular)
 1878 Jul 29 (Total)
 2024 Apr 08 (Total)
 2165 Sep 05 (Annular)
 2238 Oct 08 (Annular)

Tucson 
 1062 Dec 3 (Annular)
 1379 May 16 (Total)
 1623 Oct 23 (Total)
 1740 Dec 18 (Annular)
 1821 Aug 27 (Annular)

Albuquerque 
 1806 Jun 16 (Total)
 2012 May 20 (Annular)
 2023 Oct 14 (Annular)
 2205 Jan 21 (Total)
 2238 Oct 08 (Annular)

Austin 
 1079 Jul 01 (Total)
 1165 Nov 05 (Annular)
 1180 Jan 28 (Annular)
 1231 May 03  (Total)
 1259 Oct 17 (Total)
 1372 Sep 27 (Hybrid)
 1395 Jan 21 (Total)
 1397 May 26 (Total)
 1608 Aug 10 (Annular)
 1651 Apr 19 (Annular)
 1673 Feb 16 (Annular)
 1683 Jan 27 (Annular)
 1919 Nov 22 (Annular)
 1940 Apr 07 (Annular)
 2024 Apr 08 (Total)
 2077 Nov 15 (Annular)

San Antonio 
 1079 Jul 01 (Total)
 1097 Jul 11 (Total)
 1395 Jan 21 (Total)
 1397 May 26 (Total)
 1673 Feb 16 (Annular)
 1683 Jan 27 (Annular)
 1737 Mar 01 (Annular)
 1831 Feb 12 (Annular)
 1919 Nov 22 (Annular)
 1940 Apr 07 (Annular)
 2023 Oct 14 (Annular)
 2024 Apr 08 (Total)

Houston 
 1100 May 11 (Annular)
 1165 Nov 5 (Annular)
 1180 Jan 28 (Annular)
 1259 Oct 17 (Total)
 1286 Nov 17 (Total)
 1673 Feb 16 (Annular
 1683 Jan 27 (Annular)
 1831 Feb 12 (Annular)
 1919 Nov 22 (Annular)
 1940 Apr 07 (Annular)
 2077 Nov 15 (Annular)
 2193 Aug 26 (Annular)

Phoenix 
 1062 Dec 03 (Annular)
 1076 Mar 07 (Total)
 1379 May 16 (Total)
 1623 Oct 23 (Total)
 1806 Jun 16 (Total)
 2154 Apr 12 (Annular)
 2207 Nov 20 (Total)

Anchorage 
 1149 Apr 09 (Total)
 1458 Feb 13 (Total)
 1482 May 17 (Annular)
 1509 May 18 (Annular)
 1523 Aug 11 (Total)
 1527 May 30 (Annular)
 1565 Nov 22 (Annular)
 1939 Apr 19 (Annular)
 1943 Feb 04 (Total)
 2039 Jun 21 (Annular)
 2205 Jan 21 (Total)

Sacramento 
 1104 Feb 27 (Total)
 1540 Apr 07 (Annular)
 1597 Mar 17  (Annular)

Jacksonville 
 1137 May 21 (Annular)
 1151 Aug 13 (Total)
 1192 Dec 06 (Annular)
 1219 Dec 08 (Annular)
 1437 Apr 05 (Annular)
 1557 Apr 28 (Total)
 1940 Apr 07 (Annular)
 2198 Nov 28 (Total)
 2238 Oct 08 (Annular)

Hawaii 
 1756 Aug 25 (Annular)
 1839 Sep 07 (Annular)
 1991 Jul 11 (Total)
 2183 Sep 16 (Annular)

1900–1950

1951–2000

2001–2050

References

United States
Historical events in the United States
Solar eclipses